Lisalverto Bonilla (born June 18, 1990) is a Dominican professional baseball pitcher who is a free agent. He previously played in Major League Baseball (MLB) for the Texas Rangers and Cincinnati Reds, in the KBO League for the Samsung Lions, and in the Chinese Professional Baseball League (CPBL) for the Rakuten Monkeys and Uni-President Lions.

Career

Philadelphia Phillies 
Bonilla signed as an international free agent with the Philadelphia Phillies in 2008. He was named to appear in the All-Star Futures Game in 2012, but was unable to play due to a thumb injury.

Texas Rangers
On December 9, 2012, the Phillies traded Bonilla to the Texas Rangers with Josh Lindblom for Michael Young.

The Rangers promoted Bonilla to the major leagues on September 2, 2014. He made his major league debut on September 4, pitching three innings against the Seattle Mariners, and allowing two hits. Bonilla started the 2015 season on the 15-day disabled list due to shoulder impingement. On April 11, it was announced Bonilla had also suffered an elbow injury. He was moved to the 60-day disabled list.

Los Angeles Dodgers
On October 21, 2015, Bonilla was claimed off waivers by the Los Angeles Dodgers. However, they chose to non-tender him on December 2, making him a free agent. The Dodgers later re-signed him to a minor league contract with a spring training invitation and he was assigned to the Triple-A Oklahoma City Dodgers to begin the season. He pitched in 24 games for Oklahoma City and seven for the Tulsa Drillers in 2016. He was 5–7 in the 31 games and made 13 starts. His combined ERA was 3.97.

Pittsburgh Pirates
On November 29, 2016, Bonilla signed with the Pittsburgh Pirates for one-year at the major league minimum $575,000. 
On February 9, 2017, with the Pirates looking to clear a spot on the 40-man roster, Bonilla was designated for assignment.

Cincinnati Reds
On February 13, 2017, Bonilla was claimed off waivers by the Cincinnati Reds. He was called up to the Reds on April 18 and made his Reds debut on April 22, pitching 5 innings out of the bullpen, surrendering 4 runs on 3 hits, 3 BBs, and 6 K's in a 12–8 loss to the Chicago Cubs and was optioned back to Triple-A Louisville the next day. Bonilla was released by the Reds on September 1, 2017.

Cleveland Indians
On December 18, 2017, Bonilla signed a minor league contract with the Cleveland Indians. The deal included an invitation to the Indians' 2018 spring training camp.

Samsung Lions
On February 16, 2018, Bonilla was released by the Indians to sign with the Samsung Lions of the KBO. He became a free agent following the 2018 season.

Tigres de Quintana Roo
On April 21, 2019, Bonilla signed with the Tigres de Quintana Roo of the Mexican League.

Rakuten Monkeys
On February 17, 2020, Bonilla signed with the Rakuten Monkeys of the Chinese Professional Baseball League. He became a free agent following the season.

Uni-President Lions
On July 26, 2021, Bonilla signed with the Uni-President Lions of the Chinese Professional Baseball League (CPBL). He became a free agent following the season.

Pericos de Puebla
On February 1, 2022, Bonilla signed with the Pericos de Puebla of the Mexican League. He was released on May 19, 2022.

El Águila de Veracruz
On June 22, 2022, Bonilla signed with El Águila de Veracruz of the Mexican League. He made 8 starts for Veracruz down the stretch, posting a 1-5 record and 4.91 ERA with 30 strikeouts in 33.0 innings pitched. He was released by the team on January 19, 2023.

References

External links

1990 births
Living people
Cincinnati Reds players
Clearwater Threshers players
Dominican Republic expatriate baseball players in Mexico
Dominican Republic expatriate baseball players in South Korea
Dominican Republic expatriate baseball players in Taiwan
Dominican Republic expatriate baseball players in the United States
Dominican Summer League Phillies players
Estrellas Orientales players
Frisco RoughRiders players
Florida Complex League Phillies players
KBO League pitchers
Lakewood BlueClaws players
Leones del Escogido players
Louisville Bats players
Major League Baseball pitchers
Major League Baseball players from the Dominican Republic
Oklahoma City Dodgers players
People from Samaná Province
Pericos de Puebla players
Rakuten Monkeys players
Reading Phillies players
Round Rock Express players
Samsung Lions players
Surprise Saguaros players
Texas Rangers players
Tigres de Quintana Roo players
Tigres del Licey players
Tulsa Drillers players
Uni-President Lions players
Williamsport Crosscutters players